New Lebanon Historic District is a national historic district located at New Lebanon, Cooper County, Missouri.

The district encompasses five contributing buildings in the central business district of New Lebanon.  It developed between about 1860 and 1947, and includes representative examples of Queen Anne style architecture.

The five contributing buildings are: the Abram "Abe" Rothgeb Store Building (1926) and three ancillary buildings associated with the store - a feed and oil shed, a tool and storage shed, and a two-story barn; and the Dr. Alfred E. Monroe House (1896).

Located in the district is the previously listed New Lebanon Cumberland Presbyterian Church and School.

It was listed on the National Register of Historic Places in 1998.

References

Historic districts on the National Register of Historic Places in Missouri
Queen Anne architecture in Missouri
National Register of Historic Places in Cooper County, Missouri